Salzgitter AG  is a German company, one of the largest steel producers in Europe with an annual output of around seven million tonnes.

With over 100 subsidiaries and associated companies, the Group is structured in five divisions – Steel, Trading, Tubes, Services and Technology – under the umbrella of a management holding company.

Activities
The group's principal activity is to manufacture steel and associated products. The products include heavy profile steel sheets, hot-rolled wide strips and steel strips, heavy and medium weight plates, sheet steel, and trapezoidal sheeting. The company also owns 20% of Norddeutsche Affinerie which is the largest copper producer in Europe and as well the largest copper recycler worldwide.

History

The history of the company goes back to 1858, when in Peine the Ilseder Hütte started. The company was part in 1937 as Reichswerke Hermann Göring,
which went on to become the largest German economic enterprise in the Third Reich
along with I.G. Farben and Vereinigte Stahlwerke AG. The Reichswerke were liquidated in 1953. Its legal successor became the state owned AG für Bergbau- und Hüttenbetrieb, renamed Salzgitter AG in 1961. During the 1960s, the company was the largest state-owned corporation in the world. It went public on the German Stock Exchange in 1998.

In 1970, Salzgitter AG merged with the mining company Ilseder Hütte, which was founded in 1858 in the Hanover area in Germany to manufacture pig iron from the ore discovered in the area between Hanover and Magdeburg. The initial shareholders of Ilseder Hütte were primarily local landowners and merchants. In the 1920s the company was involved in coal mining in Westphalia to safeguard the supplies of coal required for pig iron manufacturing. The company grew through a number or mergers and acquisitions, but was hit by the economic crisis of the 1970s and became state owned through the merger with Salzgitter AG.

In December 2008 Salzgitter AG moved up from the MDAX index to the DAX index of top 30 German companies. It was demoted back to the MDAX in June 2010. Since 2019, Salzgitter AG is part of the small-cap SDAX index.

Controversy
In 2019, Germany’s Federal Cartel Office (BKartA) fined Salzgitter AG – alongside Thyssenkrupp and Voestalpine – and three individuals a combined €646 million ($712 million) for price fixing after establishing that they had agreed on certain surcharges for steel plates from 2002 to 2016.

See also 
 List of steel producers

References

External links
 

Companies based in Lower Saxony
Manufacturing companies established in 1937
Manufacturing companies of Germany
Salzgitter
History of mining in Germany
German companies established in 1858